Tangos United Methodist Church was the first Methodist Church established by Juan and Pedro Pascual in 1900, in Navotas, Philippines. The first mass was conducted in 1902 by Simeon Blas at the house of Lucio Sanchez, when fifty pastors were also baptized. The first chapel was built in 1905 and was replaced in 1929.

Vision
 A dynamic church transformed by God and open to all. (Isang buhay na iglesya na binago ng Diyos at bukas para sa lahat.)
 To reach out to the community bringing the Kingdom of God.

Programs and Services
 Discipleship Training and Spiritual Formation
 Primary education
 Child sponsorship

Target Beneficiaries
 Children and their families
 Community

Architecture
The Neo-Gothic style of the Tangos United Methodist Church is noted for the following features:
 Spires
 Gothic window plate tracery (re-interpreted)
 Nave
 Pointed arches

Present Condition

2009 Fire
On August 3, 2009, a fire started in the main sanctuary of the church. It quickly spread to other parts of the church. Damage included exposure of wooden and steel structural members, burnt concrete walls, collapsed G.I. roofing, shattered stained glasses, and breakage of the concrete spire. The damage caused by the fire cost approximately 12 million pesos.

The church is currently undergoing reconstruction. The reconstructed church will be finished in 2020. The Church Rebuilt Program was launched in 2011 to raise funds for rebuilding. The aim was to raise four million Pesos each year.

Marker from the National Historical Institute

The marker of The United Methodist Church (Tangos, Navotas) was installed on May 5, 1985, at Navotas, Metro Manila. It was installed by the National Historical Institute.

References

Marked Historical Structures of the Philippines
Churches in Metro Manila
Buildings and structures in Navotas